If you're referring to the British composer, see Robert Ramsey (composer).

Robert Ramsey (February 15, 1780 – December 12, 1849) was born in Warminster Township, Pennsylvania on February 15, 1780. He attended school in Hartsville, Pennsylvania. He served in the Pennsylvania General Assembly from 1825 to 1831 and served in the 23rd United States Congress as a Jacksonian from Pennsylvania's sixth district, March 4, 1833 to March 3, 1835. He didn't run for a second term to the 24th Congress, but did win reelection later in 1840 to the 27th Congress, still representing the sixth district, but this time as a Whig. He served from  March 4, 1841 to March 3, 1843. He once again did not run for reelection and instead left congress to engaged in agricultural pursuits. Ramsey died in Warwick, Pennsylvania on December 12, 1849. He was interred at Neshaminy Cemetery in Hartsville.

External links

Robert Ramsey at The Political Graveyard

1780 births
1849 deaths
Members of the Pennsylvania House of Representatives
Jacksonian members of the United States House of Representatives from Pennsylvania
Whig Party members of the United States House of Representatives from Pennsylvania
People from Warminster, Pennsylvania
19th-century American politicians